Gaultheria oppositifolia is a shrub in the heath family Ericaceae, endemic to New Zealand. Māori names include kama and niniwa. Common name for the genus in New Zealand is snowberry.

G. oppositifolia is a stout bushy spreading shrub that grows mostly in rocky places in the North Island, often observed beneath manuka scrub. The pairs of oval leathery toothed leaves are attached directly to the twigs. Autumn fruit is a dry red or white capsule.

References

oppositifolia
Flora of New Zealand
Berries
Taxa named by Joseph Dalton Hooker